Marianne Nölle (born 1938) is a German serial killer from Cologne. She was sentenced to life imprisonment in 1993 for seven murders.

Crimes
Nölle was a nurse who between 1984 and 1992 killed patients in her care using Truxal. Police think she killed a total of 17 and attempted 18 other murders, but she was only convicted of seven. She has never confessed to her crimes.

See also
 List of German serial killers

References

External links
German article with photo of Nölle

1938 births
German female murderers
German female serial killers
German people convicted of murder
German prisoners sentenced to life imprisonment
Living people
Medical serial killers
Nurses convicted of killing patients
People convicted of murder by Germany
Poisoners
Prisoners sentenced to life imprisonment by Germany